Philippe-Edmond Pierre Verdé-Delisle (16 May 1877 – 18 July 1960) was a French tennis player. He competed in the mixed doubles event at the 1900 Summer Olympics.

References

External links
 

1877 births
1960 deaths
French male tennis players
Olympic tennis players of France
Tennis players at the 1900 Summer Olympics
Sportspeople from Oise